Chenonceaux is a commune in the French department of Indre-et-Loire, and the region of Centre-Val de Loire, France.

It is situated in the valley of the river Cher, a tributary of the Loire, about 26 km (16 mi) east of Tours and on the right bank of the Cher.

The population of permanent residents hovers about 350 (358 in 2013; 351 in 2019), but there is a large influx of tourists during the summer months, because the village adjoins the former royal Château de Chenonceau, one of the most popular tourist destinations in France. The chateau is distinctive in being built across the river. The village is also situated in Touraine-Chenonceaux wine-growing area, and bordered on its northern edge by the Forest of Amboise.

Name
The difference in spelling between the Château's name (Chenonceau) and the village (Chenonceaux) is attributed to Louise Dupin de Francueil, owner of the chateau during the French Revolution, who is said to have dropped the "x" at the end of its name to differentiate what was a symbol of royalty from the Republic. As a result of her good relations with the village, the Chateau was spared the iconoclastic damage suffered by many other monuments during the Revolution. Although no official sources have been found to support this claim, the Château has ever since been referred to and spelled as Chenonceau.

Mme Dupin hosted the philosopher Jean-Jacques Rousseau in Chenonceau as tutor to her children, and among her descendants was the writer Georges Sand, born Aurore Dupin.

Population

See also
Communes of the Indre-et-Loire department

References

External links

 Tourism Office Chenonceaux
 Link to Official Website Chateau de Chenonceau

Communes of Indre-et-Loire